Watson Heston (September 25, 1846 – January 27, 1905) was an American editorial cartoonist who peaked in popularity during the Golden Age of Freethought in the late 19th century.

Biography

Born in Ohio, he spent the majority of his life in Carthage, Missouri. He published cartoons satirising the Republican party in People's Party publications, and his cartoons satirising religion in general and Christianity in particular, appeared in the famous freethought newspapers Truth Seeker, Etta Semple's Free-Thought Ideal, and other regional papers. Later, he would write and illustrate The Old Testament Comically Illustrated (1892), and The New Testament Comically Illustrated (1898), which caricature scenes from the Bible. In 1890, Heston published a critique of the involvement of religious clergy in politics, calling for strict separation of church and state.

The Bible Comically Illustrated was published in 1900 by the Truth Seeker Company and sold at least 10,000 copies. Few copies of this book or his earlier works survive, as most were apparently destroyed by those who did not appreciate such blasphemy. His works can be found on sale from time to time, with the asking prices usually reaching $2,000.

Gallery

References

External links
Catalog at the Hathi Trust

1846 births
1905 deaths
American cartoonists
Critics of Christianity
Freethought writers